Matt Hyde OBE is a chief executive of The Scout Association, appointed in April 2013.

As chief executive he oversaw the development and delivery of a rebrand of the Scout Association. He also worked to support the growth of Scouting in areas of deprivation.

Hyde was formerly the chief executive of the National Union of Students and is a vice-chair of the National Council of Voluntary Organizations, a trustee of Step Up to Serve, and a patron of UNLOCK (a national association of reformed offenders). He became a trustee of Comic Relief in February 2019 and was appointed OBE in the New Year's honors list in December 2019.

References

External links
 Notable Alumni - Queen Mary University of London
Westminster Uni Graduate Profile

Living people
British chief executives
Alumni of the University of Westminster
Members of the Order of the British Empire
Year of birth missing (living people)